The 683d Aircraft Control and Warning Squadron is an inactive United States Air Force unit. It was last assigned to the 31st Air Division, Aerospace Defense Command, stationed at Sweetwater Air Force Station, Texas. It was inactivated on 30 September 1969.

The unit was a General Surveillance Radar squadron providing for the air defense of the United States.

Lineage
 Established as 683d Aircraft Control and Warning Squadron
 Activated on 1 December 1953
 Inactivated on 30 September 1969

Assignments
 4702d Defense Wing, 1 December 1953
 33d Air Division, 1 January 1954
 Albuquerque Air Defense Sector, 1 January 1960
 Oklahoma City Air Defense Sector, 15 September 1960
 4752d Air Defense Wing, 1 September 1961
 Oklahoma City Air Defense Sector, 25 June 1963
 31st Air Division, 1 April 1966 - 30 September 1969

Stations
 Geiger Field, Washington, 1 December 1953
 Tinker AFB, Oklahoma, 1 January 1954
 Sweetwater AFS, Texas, 1 March 1956 - 30 September 1969

References

  Cornett, Lloyd H. and Johnson, Mildred W., A Handbook of Aerospace Defense Organization  1946 - 1980,  Office of History, Aerospace Defense Center, Peterson AFB, CO (1980).
 Winkler, David F. & Webster, Julie L., Searching the Skies, The Legacy of the United States Cold War Defense Radar Program,  US Army Construction Engineering Research Laboratories, Champaign, IL (1997).

External links

Radar squadrons of the United States Air Force
Aerospace Defense Command units